Harry's Law is an American legal dramedy television series created by David E. Kelley, which premiered on NBC on January 17, 2011. The show revolves around Harriet Korn (Kathy Bates), a recently fired patent lawyer, and her group of associates as they come together to form a unique law practice in a rundown shoe store in Cincinnati. During the course of the series, 34 episodes of Harry’s Law aired over two seasons.

Series overview

Episodes

Season 1 (2011)

Season 2 (2011–12)

References

External links 
 
 

Lists of American crime television series episodes
Lists of American comedy-drama television series episodes

it:Episodi di Harry's Law (prima stagione)